Jacki also referred to as Jakie/Jackson/Jaxon or Jacky is an Indian film Production Designer and an Art Director in the South Indian Film Industry predominantly focusing on the Tamil Film Industry. He was widely recognized in the film industry for his works in National Award-winning films such as Paruthiveeran, Aadukalam and Visaranai.

Early life 
Jacki was born in May 1974 as Immanuel Ambrose Jackson in Bangalore. He graduated from the Government College of Fine Arts in Chennai, India.

Filmography

Art direction for Vada Chennai
Vada Chennai art director on working with Vetrimaaran
Vada Chennai Set Making Video| Dhanush

References

External links

External links
 

Indian art directors
1974 births
Living people